The James Tait Black Memorial Prizes are literary prizes awarded for literature written in the English language. They, along with the Hawthornden Prize, are Britain's oldest literary awards. Based at the University of Edinburgh in Scotland, United Kingdom, the prizes were founded in 1919 by Janet Coats Black in memory of her late husband, James Tait Black, a partner in the publishing house of A & C Black Ltd. Prizes are awarded in three categories: Fiction, Biography and Drama (since 2013).

History
From its inception, the James Tait Black prize was organised without overt publicity. There was a lack of press and publisher attention, initially at least, because Edinburgh was distant from the literary centres of the country. The decision about the award was made by the Regius Chair of Rhetoric and Belles Lettres at the University of Edinburgh.

Four winners of the Nobel Prize in Literature received the James Tait Black earlier in their careers: William Golding, Nadine Gordimer and J. M. Coetzee each collected the James Tait Black for fiction, whilst Doris Lessing took the prize for biography. In addition to these literary Nobels, Sir Ronald Ross, whose 1923 autobiography Memoirs, Etc. received the biography prize, was already a Nobel laureate, having been awarded the 1902 Nobel Prize in Physiology or Medicine for his work on malaria.

In 2012, a third prize category was announced for Drama, with the first winner of this award announced in August 2013.

Selection process and prize administration
The winners are chosen by the Professor of English Literature at the university, who is assisted by postgraduate students in the shortlisting phase, a structure which is seen to lend the prizes a considerable gravitas. At the award of the 2006 prizes, at which Cormac McCarthy was a winner, McCarthy's publisher commented positively on the selection process noting that, in the absence of a sponsor and literary or media figures amongst the judging panel, the decision is made by "students and professors, whose only real agenda can be great books and great writing".  The original endowment is now supplemented by the university and, as a consequence, the total prize fund rose from 2005 awards. Each of the three annual prizes—one for fiction, one for biography, and one for drama—is worth £10,000. The university is advised in relation to the development and administration of the Prize by a small committee which includes Ian Rankin, Alexander McCall Smith and James Naughtie amongst its members. In August 2007 the prize ceremony was held at the Edinburgh International Book Festival for the first time.

Eligibility
For the book prizes works of fiction and biographies must be written in English. The nationality of the author does not matter, but submissions must be first published (or co-published) in Britain during the calendar year of the award. Any given author can only win each prize once. However, he or she can win both prizes at the same time.

For the drama category, the work must be originally written in either English, Gaelic or Welsh, be produced first during the previous calendar year, have a playing time over one hour, and have been performed no fewer than seven times by a professional theatre company.

List of recipients 
Source.

Best of the James Tait Black (2012)

In 2012, a special prize was given called the 'Best of the James Tait Black' (in addition to the normal prize for that year). The award celebrated the fiction winners over the past 93 years, as part of the 250th anniversary of the study of English Literature at the university. A shortlist of six previous winners competed for the title of Best. A judging panel of celebrity alumni and writers decided on the winner, which was announced on 6 December 2012 as Angela Carter's Nights at the Circus.

Shortlist
 Angela Carter, Nights at the Circus (1984)
Graham Greene, The Heart of the Matter (1948)
James Kelman, A Disaffection (1989)
Cormac McCarthy, The Road (2006)
Caryl Phillips, Crossing the River (1993)
Muriel Spark, The Mandelbaum Gate (1965)

References

External links
 James Tait Black Prizes homepage, University of Edinburgh
 James Tait Black Memorial Prize winners at Faded Page
 Windows Media Video report of the 2007 James Tait Black Prize ceremony
 New Statesman article on the James Tait Black and Booker prizes
 James Tait Black feature on the BBC Radio 4's 'Open Book' (includes audio link)

English-language literary awards
 
Biography awards
British fiction awards
Scottish literary awards
Awards established in 1919
1919 establishments in Scotland
History of the University of Edinburgh